Frank R. Zindler (May 23, 1939) is an American atheist who served as interim president of the organization American Atheists in 2008. Prior to his involvement in the atheist community, he was Chairman, Division of Science, Nursing, & Technology, at Fulton-Montgomery Community College of the State University of New York. After the abduction and murder of Madalyn Murray O'Hair, her son Jon Garth Murray, and granddaughter Robin Eileen Murray-O'Hair in 1995, he became editor of both American Atheist magazine and Director of American Atheist Press. In 2009, he retired as editor of the magazine but continues as Director of American Atheist Press. In the spring of 2011, he published a multi-volume anthology of his short essays and other works.

At a party celebrating his 80th birthday, he came out of the closet as a gay man by giving a dramatic reading of the "Confessions" part of his autobiography.

Debates
“Over the course of a long life, Zindler engaged in a great number of radio, TV, and platform debates in defense of the “Wall of Separation” between state and church; the civil rights of atheists, humanists, secularists, and secularism generally; abortion rights and the right of women to control their own bodies; and the right to “death with dignity” at the end of life. He vigorously defended the teaching of evolution in public schools and the rights of LGBTQ Americans. [Zindler, Frank (2019). Confessions of a Born-Again Atheist, American Atheist Press, pp. 480–483] 

“Among his most memorable debates were his radio debate (WMUZ Detroit, Al Kresta Show, November 14, 1989) with John P. Koster (author of The Atheist Syndrome) on the question “Does God Exist?” [Zindler, Frank (2011). Through Atheist Eyes: Scenes From a World That Won’t Reason, Vol. III: Debates, pp. 7–120]; his TV debate (Channel 13, Indianapolis, IN, The Dick Wolfsie Show) with John D. Morris on “The Question of Noah’s Flood” [Zindler, Frank (2011). Through Atheist Eyes: Scenes From a World That Won’t Reason, Vol. III: Debates, pp. 120–189]; and several radio debates (e.g., WTVN 610 AM, “Night Talk with Jim Bleikamp” in Columbus, OH) with Duane T. Gish on the question “Is Creationism Science?” [Zindler, Frank (2011). Through Atheist Eyes: Scenes From a World That Won’t Reason, Vol. III: Debates, pp. 191–267]. He also had a famous debate with philosopher and theologian William Lane Craig at Willow Creek Community Church, South Barrington, IL on June 27, 1993. [8 (original number)]” 

Zindler is also a proponent of the mythicist theory that no historical person lies behind the Gospel picture of Jesus of Nazareth. After the publication of Bart Ehrman's 2012 book Did Jesus Exist? The Historical Argument for Jesus of Nazareth arguing (from a non-religious perspective) for the existence of a historical Jesus, Zindler and Robert M. Price co-edited an anthology of essays by various mythicists arguing against Ehrman's position.

In 2022, Frank published his eleventh book, The Amityville Horror: An Inquest into Paranormal Claims. [Zindler, Frank (2022). The Amityville Horror: An Inquest into Paranormal Claims. GCRR Press] The book was begun in the fall of 1979, as an example for his students of how to investigate claims of the supernatural and paranormal. [Zindler, Frank (2022). The Amityville Horror: An Inquest into Paranormal Claims. GCRR Press, pp. xvii–xx (Preface) and pp. 1–8 (Introduction)] When the book was two-thirds completed it was put aside when an oral publishing agreement fell apart. The story of how this played out is described both in his Confessions[Zindler, Frank (2019). Confessions of a Born-Again Atheist, American Atheist Press, pp. 483–488] and in his exposé of The Amityville Horror. [Zindler, Frank (2022). The Amityville Horror: An Inquest into Paranormal Claims. GCRR Press, pp. xvii–xx (Preface) and pp. 1–8 (Introduction)]”

Selected bibliography
Zindler has authored, co-authored or edited several texts on atheism:
 
 
 
 
 
 
 
 
 
 
 
  
 
 
 Zindler, Frank R. (2019). Confessions of a Born-Again Atheist: The Implausible Lives of a Godless Guy. American Atheist Press. .
 Zindler, Frank R. (2022). The Amityville Horror: An Inquest into Paranormal Claims, GCRR Press, ISBN 978-1-959281-02-3 (Print) and ISBN 978-1-959281-03-0 (eBook)

References

External links
 
 Frank Zindler profile at The Jesus Project
 
 "Frank Zindler - The Christ Myth," interview on the Point of Inquiry Podcast
 A Life Celebration: Frank Zindler

1939 births
American atheism activists
Christ myth theory proponents
Critics of Christianity
Living people
Writers about religion and science
American Atheist Magazine editors